Elisabeth 'Bessie' Holmes Moore (March 5, 1876 – January 22, 1959) was an American tennis champion who was active at the beginning of the 20th century. Moore won the singles title at the U.S. Championships on four occasions. She was inducted into the International Tennis Hall of Fame in 1971.

Biography
Elisabeth Moore was born on March 5, 1876, in Brooklyn, the daughter of George Edward Moore (1840–1911), an affluent cotton broker, and Sarah Z. Orr (1857–1942). She was raised and schooled in Ridgewood, New Jersey. She learned to play tennis at age 12. Moore reached her first U.S. National Championships singles final in 1892 at the age of 16 years and three months, losing to Mabel Cahill from Ireland in the first five-set match contested between two women. In the final years of the 19th century, she had a rivalry with Juliette Atkinson.

She won the inaugural U.S. Indoor Women's Singles Championship in 1907, defeating Marie Wagner in the final in three sets. In 1908, she also won the inaugural indoor doubles title with partner Helen Pouch.

Elisabeth Moore died on January 22, 1959, in Starke, Florida, from congestive heart failure.

Grand Slam finals

Singles (4 titles, 5 runners-up)

Doubles (2 titles, 3 runner-ups)

Mixed doubles (2 titles)

References

External links
 

1876 births
1959 deaths
19th-century American people
19th-century female tennis players
American female tennis players
People from Ridgewood, New Jersey
Sportspeople from Bergen County, New Jersey
Sportspeople from Brooklyn
Tennis people from New Jersey
Tennis people from New York (state)
United States National champions (tennis)
Grand Slam (tennis) champions in women's singles
Grand Slam (tennis) champions in women's doubles
Grand Slam (tennis) champions in mixed doubles
International Tennis Hall of Fame inductees